"Whole Lotta Love" is a song by English rock band Led Zeppelin. It is the opening track on the band's second album, Led Zeppelin II, and was released as a single in 1969 in several countries; as with other Led Zeppelin songs, no single was released in the United Kingdom. In the United States, it became their first hit and was certified gold.  Parts of the song's lyrics were adapted from Willie Dixon's "You Need Love", recorded by Muddy Waters in 1962; originally uncredited to Dixon, a lawsuit in 1985 was settled with a payment to Dixon and credit on subsequent releases.

In 2004, the song was ranked number 75 on Rolling Stone magazine's list of the 500 Greatest Songs of All Time, and in March 2005, Q placed "Whole Lotta Love" at number three in its list of the 100 Greatest Guitar Tracks. It was placed 11 on a similar list by Rolling Stone. In 2009 it was named the third greatest hard rock song of all time by VH1.  In 2014, listeners to BBC Radio 2 voted "Whole Lotta Love" as containing the greatest guitar riff of all time.

Composition and recording

Jimmy Page came up with the guitar riff for "Whole Lotta Love" in the summer of 1968, on his houseboat on the River Thames at Pangbourne, Berkshire, England. However, John Paul Jones stated that it probably was developed from a live improvisation during performances of "Dazed and Confused".  Page denied that the song originated onstage and that he had the riff and the rest took it from there.

Notation for the song indicates the key of E major and a tempo of 92 beats per minute in a compound AABA form. During the two day mix of the Led Zeppelin II album, audio engineer Eddie Kramer discovered that there was some bleed though of Plant's vocals on the "Whole Lotta Love" track which couldn't be removed, so he put some echo on it, and Page liked the sound. Page also employed a backwards echo production technique.

Release
On 7 November 1969, "Whole Lotta Love" was released as a single in several countries, with "Living Loving Maid (She's Just a Woman)" as the B-side. In the US, Atlantic provided an edited 3:12 version as the flipside for radio stations. Billboard described the single as a "powerful, commercial swinger that should have no trouble putting [Led Zeppelin] up the Hot 100."  Cash Box described it as "a mixture of rock and blues with special production touches and a rousing lead vocal performance." In the UK, Atlantic Records expected to issue an edited version, and pressed initial copies for release on 5 December 1969, but this was cancelled by request of manager Peter Grant.

Similarities to "You Need Love"

In 1962, Muddy Waters recorded a blues vocal, "You Need Love", for Chess Records. As he had done with "You Shook Me", Waters overdubbed vocals on an instrumental track previously recorded by blues guitarist Earl Hooker and his band. Willie Dixon wrote the lyrics, which Dixon biographer Mitsutoshi Inaba describes as being "about the necessity of love":

In 1966, the British band Small Faces recorded the song as "You Need Loving" for their eponymous debut Decca album. According to Steve Marriott, the group's vocalist and guitarist, Page and Plant attended several Small Faces gigs, where they expressed their interest in the song. Plant's phrasing is particularly similar to that of Marriott's, who added "he [Plant] sang it the same, phrased it the same, even the stops at the end were the same". Similarities with "You Need Love" led to a lawsuit against Led Zeppelin in 1985, settled out of court in favour of Dixon for an undisclosed amount. On subsequent releases, Dixon's name is included on the credits for "Whole Lotta Love".  Plant explained in an interview with Musician:

Accolades

(*) designates unordered lists.

Charts and certifications
The single entered the Billboard Hot 100 chart on 22 November 1969. It remained on the chart for 15 weeks, peaking at no. 4 and becoming the band's only top 10 single in the US.

Original release

Single (digital download)

Note: The official UK Singles Chart incorporated legal downloads as of 17 April 2005.

Year-end charts

Certifications

Performances
Led Zeppelin first performed "Whole Lotta Love" on 26 April 1969. Other live versions were released officially:
The Song Remains the Same (28 September 1976, from a 1973 concert and movie soundtrack)
Led Zeppelin BBC Sessions (11 November 1997, from a 1971 concert)
How the West Was Won (27 May 2003, from a 1972 concert)
Led Zeppelin DVD (2003, from a 1979 and a 1970 concert)

"Whole Lotta Love" was the last song Led Zeppelin played live. It was however performed again at the band's reunions at Live Aid in 1985 (with drummers Phil Collins and Tony Thompson), at the Atlantic Records 40th Anniversary concert in 1988, and at the Ahmet Ertegun Tribute Concert at the O2 Arena, London, on 10 December 2007 (both with drummer Jason Bonham).

In 2008, a reworked version by Jimmy Page on guitar, with Leona Lewis on vocals, was performed in the "London 2012" presentation during the closing ceremony of the 2008 Olympic Games in Beijing.  Both Lewis and the organisers requested that some of the lyrics be changed, notably "I'm gonna give you every inch of my love". Lewis felt that the line made little sense coming from a female singer.

Cover versions
"Whole Lotta Love" has been recorded by several artists. Versions that reached the record charts include:
1970CCS (or C.C.S.) recorded a mainly instrumental rendition with a flute playing the melody. Billboard described their version as a "blockbuster instrumental treatment of the Led Zeppelin hit", while Nick Coleman of The Independent thought that the cover "succeeded in ameliorating the tune's sexual specificity without stripping it of its rutty throb". The UK music variety television programme Top of the Pops used brief versions by CCS members and others as its intro theme music at different times over the years.
1971King Curtis and the Kingpins recorded an instrumental version with the melody line performed on saxophone. A live version, recorded at the Fillmore West, is included on Curtis' 1971 live album Live at Fillmore West.
1975Tina Turner on her 1975 album Acid Queen.
1996British band Goldbug, including a sample of "Asteroid" (the Pearl & Dean advertising music). In 2000, band member Richard Walmsley sued his former label Acid Jazz over unpaid royalties relating to the song. Walmsley received thousands of pounds following the battle.

See also
List of number-one singles in Australia during the 1970s
List of number-one hits of 1970 (Germany)
List of Led Zeppelin songs written or inspired by others

References

External links

1969 songs
1969 singles
1975 singles
1996 singles
Atlantic Records singles
United Artists Records singles
Grammy Hall of Fame Award recipients
Led Zeppelin songs
Number-one singles in Australia
Number-one singles in Germany
Songs involved in plagiarism controversies
Song recordings produced by Jimmy Page
Songs written by Jimmy Page
Songs written by John Bonham
Songs written by John Paul Jones (musician)
Songs written by Robert Plant
Songs written by Willie Dixon
Tina Turner songs
Music television series theme songs